The Man Inside is a 2012 British boxing film written and directed by Dan Turner.

Plot
A young boxer tries to distance himself from his father's criminal past.

Soundtrack

References

External links

2012 films
British boxing films
2010s English-language films
2010s British films